The Mongolian National Democratic Party (abbreviated МҮАН or MNDP), and known until 2011 as the National New Party (ҮШН), is a Mongolian political party established in 2005. The party is headed by Mendsaikhany Enkhsaikhan, a former Prime Minister of Mongolia from July 7, 1996 to April 23, 1998.

The party formed a parliamentary coalition called Justice Coalition with the Mongolian People's Revolutionary Party, a party established in 2010.

The coalition ended up having 11 seats in the Mongolian Parliament State Great Khural during the 2012 parliamentary elections held on 28 June 2012. The Justice Coalition formed a coalition government in Mongolia with the Democratic Party after the 2012 elections, but obtained no seats in the 2016 elections.

This party (MNDP/MYAH) should not be confused with the similarly-named Mongolian National Democratic Party that was established in 1992 and continued until 1999, when it became a co-founder of the Democratic Party.

See also
Politics of Mongolia
List of political parties in Mongolia

References

2005 establishments in Mongolia
Conservative parties in Asia
Mongolian nationalism
Nationalist parties in Asia
Political parties established in 2005
Political parties in Mongolia